The Glass Bowl was an annual post-season college football bowl game played from 1946 to 1949. It was held at the University of Toledo's Glass Bowl.

Toledo had been a manufacturing center for glass objects, including automotive glass for nearby Detroit factories.  Wayne Kohn, a shipyard worker at a Toledo glass company suggested to municipal leaders a "Glass Bowl" would be a way to build the city's and industry's prestige. The University of Toledo made the announcement of the new bowl game at a press conference in New York City on October 25, 1946.

The University of Toledo operated the Glass Bowl Game as part of its regular schedule.  In the four seasons of 1946 through 1949, Toledo had winning records going into the December date.  Toledo won the first three contests but their perfect Glass Bowl record was shattered by the University of Cincinnati in the fourth bowl.

In 1950, the game was to be played on December 2, however in early November the University of Toledo's athletic board voted to postpone the game until December 1951 – at the time, Toledo's record was 2–4. In 1951, the University of Toledo called off the game scheduled for December 1, as no schools contacted had indicated they would take part in it; the uncertainty of December weather was also cited.

Like some other postseason match-ups of the era, such as the Grape Bowl and the Optimist Bowl, results are listed in NCAA records, but the games were not considered NCAA-sanctioned bowls.

Game results

1946: Toledo 21, Bates 12

 
Newspaper accounts lack detail of the 4th quarter missed conversion.

1947: Toledo 20, New Hampshire 14

1948: Toledo 27, Oklahoma City 14

 
Newspaper accounts are unclear as to which Chuck Hardy touchdown – rushing or passing – happened first in the 4th quarter, and which 4th quarter conversion failed.

1949: Cincinnati 33, Toledo 13

 
Newspaper accounts lack detail of the missed conversions.

See also
 List of college bowl games

References

Defunct college football bowls